Luis Ángel Malagón Velázquez (born 2 March 1997) is a Mexican professional footballer who plays as a goalkeeper for Liga MX club América.

International career

Youth
Malagón was called up by Jaime Lozano to participate with the under-23 team at the 2019 Pan American Games, with Mexico winning the third-place match. He also participated at the 2020 CONCACAF Olympic Qualifying Championship. In the final group stage match against the United States, Malagón suffered an elbow injury, causing him to miss the rest of the tournament. Mexico went on to win the competition. He was subsequently called up to participate in the 2020 Summer Olympics. Malagón won the bronze medal with the Olympic team.

Senior
Malagón got his first call-up to the senior national team by Gerardo Martino for a friendly match against Chile in December 2021.

Career statistics

Club

Honours
Mexico U23
Pan American Bronze Medal: 2019
CONCACAF Olympic Qualifying Championship: 2020
Olympic Bronze Medal: 2020

References

External links
 
 
 
 

1997 births
Living people
Footballers from Michoacán
Mexican footballers
Association football goalkeepers
Club Necaxa footballers
Atlético Morelia players
Olympic footballers of Mexico
Footballers at the 2020 Summer Olympics
Olympic medalists in football
Olympic bronze medalists for Mexico
Medalists at the 2020 Summer Olympics
Pan American Games medalists in football
Pan American Games bronze medalists for Mexico
Footballers at the 2019 Pan American Games
Medalists at the 2019 Pan American Games